Kelley Kali Chatman is an American director, actor, writer, and producer. She is the creator of the 2021 indie film I'm Fine (Thanks for Asking), which has won several awards in the film festival circuit.

Biography
Kali was born in Northridge, California.

She got her bachelor's degree in anthropology, with majors in archeology and minors in film and classical civilization from Howard University. As a student there, Kali directed on multiple episodes for the Belize dramatic television series Noh Matta Wat!

She attended the USC School of Cinematic Arts in TV and Film Production program, graduating with a Master of Fine Arts in 2018. She released the short film Lalo's House, a drama concerning child sex trafficking in Haiti. According to Kali, the film was nine years in the making and had been part of her application project as well as her thesis project for USC. The film won the Programmers Award at the Pan African Film Festival.

Kali was professionally trained in acting at Ivana Chubbuck Studios and received training in directing from the University of California.

She was also selected to work with Ron Howard and Brian Grazer's company New Form to develop her web series, The Discovery of Dit Dodson.

In 2020, Kali directed, wrote, produced, and starred in the feature film, I'm Fine (Thanks for Asking), which was released on August 7, 2021.

Kali will be directing a television drama called Kemba which is produced by MPI and will be broadcast on BET.

Awards

 2021 Academy Gold Fellowship
 SXSW Special Jury Recognition for Multi-Hyphenate Storyteller to Kelley Kali
 45th Annual Student Academy Award
 Directors Guild of America Student Filmmaker Award
 KCET Fine Cut Award
 Shadow and Act's “Rising Award”
 Diversity in Cannes Showcase, sponsored by Viola Davis and Julius Tennon's JuVee Productions - Jury Award and Audience Award
 Florida Film Festival - Special Jury Award for Persistence of Vision to Kelley Kali
 Paul Robeson Award – Noh Matta Wat!
 Best Short Film at Calcutta International Cult Films Festival – Lola's House
 Carthage Film Festival Award – Lola's House
 The Programmers' Award at the Oscar - qualifying Pan African Film Festival

References

Living people
Film directors from Los Angeles
Actresses from Los Angeles
People from Northridge, Los Angeles
Year of birth missing (living people)